is a fighting video game developed and published by Namco as the fourth main and fifth installment in the Tekken series, following the release of the non-canon crossover titled Tekken Tag Tournament in 1999. It was released as an arcade game in 2001, and on the PlayStation 2 in 2002.

Placing distinction on the plot in the console version, the tone of Tekken 4 was noticeably darker than other installments of the series. The game also harbored many gameplay revisions, such as the series-unique ability for the player to move about before the round begins and the introduction of walled stages. There are up to twenty-three characters to choose from, including six newcomers. The game's story reveals that Kazuya has been revived following his death 20 years prior and enters the King of Iron Fist Tournament 4 to take back the Mishima Zaibatsu. Its sequel, Tekken 5, was released in 2004.

Gameplay
Tekken 4 introduced significant new gameplay changes from the previous games in the series. For the first time, it allowed players to maneuver around an arena interacting with walls and other obstacles for extra damage. These "environmental hazards" in turn allowed players to juggle opponents for consecutive combos and allowed the designers to implement a "switch maneuver", which let players escape from cornering and throw the tide in their favor. The game engine had been tweaked to be more focused on the environment, causing the characters to move more slowly and fluidly than in Tekken Tag Tournament. Finally, the game introduced a brand new graphics system, that featured increased lighting, dynamic physics, and smoother surfaces.

The console version of Tekken 4 includes a beat 'em up minigame available from the outset, called Tekken Force. Similar to the previous minigame found in Tekken 3, it presents the player with an over-the-shoulder perspective as they fight wave upon wave of Heihachi's Tekken Force through four stages, eventually facing Heihachi himself. The player can pick up health and power-ups while fighting waves of enemies. In the minigame it is discovered that the Tekken Force possesses different ranks in the organization, evident in different amounts of stamina, strength, and skill.  A new Story mode in the home version unlocks cutscenes when played, in contrast to previous installments in which such cutscenes were unlocked from playing the Arcade mode. Tekken 4 received generally favorable reviews. Community reception was generally negative, with competitive players pointing out its balancing and gameplay issues. However in recent years, Tekken 4 has been widely praised for its innovation, atmosphere and attention to detail.

Characters

The arcade version features a total of 23 characters, consisting of 16 returning and 6 new ones. The returning characters include a couple ones who did not make the cut in the 19-year time skip between Tekken 2 and Tekken 3. The console version adds two characters, both palette swaps of existing ones. 10 characters are available by default, with the rest being unlocked by clearing Story Mode multiple times.

New characters
 Christie Monteiro: A Capoeira student in search for her friend and teacher, Eddy Gordo.
 Combot : A general purpose robot created by the Violet Systems who is able to mimic other characters' fighting styles.
 Craig Marduk: An undefeated Vale Tudo fighter who had killed Armor King and is joining the tournament under the lure of Armor King's student King II
 Miharu Hirano   : The best friend of Ling Xiaoyu.
 Steve Fox: A young boxing champion who seeks to find out about his past.
 Violet   : The alter-ego of Lee Chaolan.

Returning characters

 Bryan Fury 
 Eddy Gordo   
 Heihachi Mishima 
 Hwoarang
 Jin Kazama 
 Julia Chang 

 Kazuya Mishima
 King II
 Kuma II 
 Lee Chaolan 
 Lei Wulong  
 Ling Xiaoyu

 Marshall Law
 Nina Williams 
 Panda  
 Paul Phoenix
 Yoshimitsu

 Unlockable character
 Only playable in console version (make a cameo appearances in arcade version)
 Skin/palette swap
 Skin/palette swap when Lee Chaolan unlocked

Plot
Two years after the King of Iron Fist Tournament 3, Heihachi Mishima and his scientists have captured samples of Ogre's blood and tissue to splice with Heihachi's genome, in order to make him immortal. The experiment fails since Heihachi lacks the Devil gene. His grandson, Jin Kazama, possesses the Devil gene but has been missing since the previous tournament. Meanwhile, Heihachi learns that the body of his son, Kazuya Mishima, who also had the Devil gene and whom Heihachi killed by throwing into a volcano twenty years ago, is stored in the labs of the G Corporation, a cutting edge biotech firm making revolutionary advances in the field of biogenetics research. Heihachi sends his Tekken Forces to raid G Corporation facility in order to retrieve Kazuya's remains. However, the mission fails when the Tekken Force is wiped out by none other than Kazuya himself, who has been revived by G Corporation a few days after his apparent death. Unknown to Heihachi, Jin has been in a self-imposed training exile in Brisbane, to unlearn the Mishima karate style and master traditional karate, loathing anything to do with his bloodline since Heihachi's betrayal.

In an attempt to lure Kazuya and Jin out, Heihachi announces the King of Iron Fist Tournament 4, with the ownership of the Mishima Zaibatsu being the top prize. Ling Xiaoyu remains a ward of the Mishima Zaibatsu during this time, she enters the tournament in hopes of reconnecting with Jin and uncovering the Mishima Zaibatsu’s nefarious deeds. Xiaoyu is saved from Heihachi's evil plans by Yoshimitsu, who informs her of the Mishima family's tragic history. After Jin won his match against Hwoarang by default when the South Korean Army took him into custody and Kazuya defeated Violet. Jin and Kazuya were scheduled to fight at Stage 7, Jin is ambushed and captured by the Tekken Force and taken to Hon-Maru, a Mishima Dojo in the woods. After Kazuya was declared the winner of Stage 7 by default, he meets Heihachi at the final stage and questions him of Jin's disappearance. They clash and Heihachi emerges victorious. After the fight, instead of killing Kazuya outright, Heihachi leads him to Hon-Maru, where an unconscious Jin has been chained. Before Heihachi can enchain his son as well, Kazuya's body is suddenly taken over by Devil, who explains to Heihachi that 21 years ago, after throwing Kazuya into a volcano, half of its entity split from it and possessed Jin. Devil telekinetically knocks out Heihachi and then subconsciously taunts Jin, which causes him to wake up with his Devil powers activated. Breaking the chains, an enraged Jin fights Kazuya and defeats him. Heihachi regains consciousness and goes to fight against an exhausted Jin, but is also defeated. As he is about to finish Heihachi, a vision of his mother, Jun Kazama, causes him to spare Heihachi in her honor. Stretching his Devil wings, Jin takes flight, leaving the unconscious Kazuya and Heihachi in Hon-Maru.

Reception

In Japan, Game Machine listed Tekken 4 on their September 1, 2001 issue as being the most-successful arcade game of the month.

Tekken 4 has received an averaged score of 81% at GameRankings and 79/100 at Metacritic. Edge gave it a mediocre review, highlighting the game's experimental and pretty nature, and that overall it is a more solid and thoughtful proposition than its predecessor, but concluded that the game feels "over-familiar and curiously uninspired." On the other hand, GameSpot's Greg Kasavin referred to it to "one of the better fighting games in years" and "an extremely solid, long-lasting, accessible, and fun-to-play fighting game that comes from one of the world's best developers of the genre." GameSpot named Tekken 4 the best PlayStation 2 game of September 2002, and nominated it for the publication's "Best Fighting Game of 2002" award.IGN's Jeremy Dunham noted the walls and confined spaces as "probably Namco's wisest decision," and called the game "a solid fighter in every sense of the word."

Notes

References

External links
  (PS2) 
  (arcade)  (archived)
 

2001 video games
Arcade video games
Fighting games used at the Evolution Championship Series tournament
Fighting games used at the Super Battle Opera tournament
Interactive Achievement Award winners
Multiplayer and single-player video games
Namco arcade games
Namco beat 'em ups
PlayStation 2 games
Tekken games
Video game sequels
Video games developed in Japan
Video games scored by Satoru Kōsaki
Video games scored by Yuu Miyake
Video games set in Tokyo
Video games set in Brazil
Video games set in the United States
Video games set in Philadelphia
Video games set in Japan
D.I.C.E. Award for Fighting Game of the Year winners